The electoral district of Gembrook was an electoral district of the Victorian Legislative Assembly. It was situated on the edge of metropolitan Melbourne. Included within its boundaries were Emerald, Cockatoo, Gembrook, Beaconsfield, and sizeable parts of Berwick and Pakenham. The district formerly extended north to Yarra Valley communities such as Warburton and Launching Place prior to the seat's redistribution at the 2014 election.

The electorate was created in 2002, replacing the abolished electorates of Pakenham (which had its namesake moved into Bass) and Berwick. It was widely considered to be a safe Liberal seat, and was to be contested by Shadow Treasurer Robert Dean, formerly the member for Berwick. However, in a heavily publicised gaffe, it was discovered during the campaign that Dean was ineligible to stand as a candidate because he had not updated his enrolment after moving to his new electorate, and was therefore no longer a registered voter. He was quickly replaced with Neil Lucas, the MLC for the corresponding upper house seat of Eumemmerring Province. In an upset result widely attributed to the Dean affair, Lucas was defeated by Labor candidate Tammy Lobato. Lobato was narrowly re-elected at the 2006 election, but was defeated at the 2010 election by Brad Battin.

The seat was abolished by the Electoral Boundaries Commission ahead of the 2022 election and split into the electoral districts of Berwick, Pakenham and Monbulk.

Members for Gembrook

Election results

References

External links
 Electorate profile: Gembrook District, Victorian Electoral Commission

2002 establishments in Australia
Former electoral districts of Victoria (Australia)
2022 disestablishments in Australia